Sumthing Distribution was an American based company started by Nile Rodgers that distributes recording artist and independent record labels. It was the largest African-American owned distribution company in America.
It was announced on January 3, 2019, that the company had gone out of business that week.

See also
 List of record labels

References

External links
Sumthing Distribution's Official Websites
Sumthing Digital

Record label distributors
Record labels established in 1998
American independent record labels